In mathematics, a quasithin group is a finite simple group that resembles a group of Lie type of rank at most 2 over a field of characteristic 2. More precisely it is a finite simple group of characteristic 2 type and width 2. Here characteristic 2 type means that its centralizers of involutions resemble those of groups of Lie type over fields of characteristic 2, and the width is roughly the maximal rank of an abelian group of odd order normalizing a non-trivial 2-subgroup of G. When G is a group of Lie type of characteristic 2 type, the width is usually the rank (the dimension of a maximal torus of the algebraic group).

Classification 
The classification of quasithin groups is a crucial part of the classification of finite simple groups.

Groups of Lie type of characteristic 2 and rank 1 or 2, except that U5(q) only occurs for q = 4
PSL4(2), PSL5(2), Sp6(2)
The alternating groups on 5, 6, 8, 9, points
PSL2(p) for p a Fermat or Mersenne prime, L(3), L(3), G2(3)
The Mathieu groups M11, M12, M22, M23, M24, The Janko groups J2, J3, J4, the Higman-Sims group, the Held group, and the Rudvalis group.

If the condition "even characteristic" is relaxed to "even type" in the sense of the revision of the classification by Daniel Gorenstein, Richard Lyons, and Ronald Solomon, then the only extra group that appears is the Janko group J1.

References

 (unpublished typescript)

Finite groups